Martin Thomas Devaney (born 1 June 1980) is a football coach and former professional midfielder who was most recently caretaker manager of EFL Championship club Barnsley. Born in England of Irish parents, Devaney has played for the Ireland under-16s.

Playing career

Early career
Devaney started playing football for Charlton Rovers AFC and attended Balcarras School in Charlton Kings, Cheltenham. He was on Coventry City's books as a youngster, but was released from the then Premier League club, and after playing pre-season for hometown club Cheltenham Town the then manager Steve Cotterill offered him a contract.

His initial efforts as a striker for the Robins were fairly underwhelming. However, he did become the first Cheltenham player to score a Football League hat-trick in September 2000 against Plymouth Argyle. Towards the end of his spell at Cheltenham, he was played as a wide midfielder, typically on the right wing, although occasionally on the left.

Barnsley
Devaney left Cheltenham in July 2005, initially joining Watford, however, Adrian Boothroyd could not find a place in his squad for the winger, and he was allowed to join Barnsley at the end of August. In his first season at the club he helped them to promotion, beating Swansea City on penalties in the play-off final. This meant all three sides Devaney represented during 2005 were promoted via the play-offs at the end of the 2005–06 season, a phenomenon dubbed The Devaney Code by fans in homage to Dan Brown's novel, The Da Vinci Code.

Devaney remained in the side with Barnsley competing in the Championship. He played in the victories against Premiership Liverpool and Chelsea in consecutive rounds to reach the FA Cup semi-finals in the 2007–08 season. In both games he provided the assist for a Barnsley goal, each a cross to allow Stephen Foster (versus Liverpool) and Kayode Odejayi (versus Chelsea) to score.

On 29 October 2009, Devaney joined Football League One side Milton Keynes Dons on a month-emergency loan. He then scored his first goal for the Dons in a stunning FA Cup encounter with Exeter City. After the Dons were losing 3–2, Devaney came off the bench to score a header from outside of the box, that being his first touch. The Dons then went on to win 4–3 in a memorable 2nd round tie.

On 7 October 2010, Devaney joined Walsall on loan for a month. He impressed in his debut game against Exeter City, setting up the Saddlers second goal and putting in a man of the match performance. In his second game he continued to impress by scoring the equaliser against Dagenham & Redbridge. He returned to Barnsley on 7 November 2010.

On 11 May 2011, Devaney's contract expired and he left Barnsley. He had become a firm favourite with the fans during his six years at the club, earning the nickname 'Disco' due to his tendency to trick defenders with spectacular footwork.

Later career
On 2 August 2011, he signed a one-year contract with Tranmere Rovers and made his competitive club debut on the first day of the 2011–12 season, starting the Football League match against Chesterfield. He was released at the end of the 2011–12 season.

On 11 February 2013, he signed with Kidderminster Harriers on a deal until the end of the season.

Towards the end of September 2013, Devaney signed a contract with struggling Conference Premier side Hyde.

On 7 March 2014, Devaney signed for Worcester City till the end of the season.

Coaching career
After gaining his UEFA 'A' Coaching License, Devaney was appointed as a Professional Development Phase Coach at Barnsley in November 2015. He went on to work with the club's Academy and Development squads.

On 24 April 2022, following the sacking of Poya Asbaghi, Devaney was appointed as caretaker manager for the rest of the season.

References

External links

1980 births
Living people
Sportspeople from Cheltenham
Republic of Ireland association footballers
Republic of Ireland football managers
Republic of Ireland youth international footballers
English footballers
English football managers
English people of Irish descent
Association football midfielders
Coventry City F.C. players
Cheltenham Town F.C. players
Watford F.C. players
Barnsley F.C. players
Milton Keynes Dons F.C. players
Walsall F.C. players
Tranmere Rovers F.C. players
Kidderminster Harriers F.C. players
Hyde United F.C. players
Worcester City F.C. players
English Football League players
Barnsley F.C. non-playing staff
Barnsley F.C. managers
English Football League managers
Association football coaches